The Brick House Beautiful is a historic house located in northeast Portland, Oregon, United States. It was built in 1922–1923 to be a model house showcasing the product line of the Standard Brick & Tile Company, based in Portland. It was also a demonstration project for the brick hollow-wall method of construction, newly introduced in the Portland market to reduce cost and improve affordability of brick houses.

It was listed on the National Register of Historic Places in 2012.

See also
 National Register of Historic Places listings in Northeast Portland, Oregon

References

External links

1920s architecture in the United States
1923 establishments in Oregon
Houses completed in 1923
Houses on the National Register of Historic Places in Portland, Oregon
Laurelhurst, Portland, Oregon
Northeast Portland, Oregon
Portland Historic Landmarks